East Jackson High School is the name of multiple secondary schools in the United States, among them:

 East Jackson Secondary School, in Jackson, Michigan
 East Jackson Comprehensive High School in Commerce, Georgia